The 2001–02 Israeli Premier League season saw Maccabi Haifa win their second consecutive title. It took place from the first match on 25 August 2001 to the final match on 18 May 2002.

Two teams from Liga Leumit were promoted at the end of the previous season: Hapoel Be'er Sheva and Maccabi Kiryat Gat. The two teams relegated were Bnei Yehuda and Tzafririm Holon.

Teams and Locations

Twelve teams took part in the 2001-02 Israeli Premier League season, including ten teams from the 2000-01 season, as well as two teams which were promoted from the 2000-01 Liga Leumit.

Hapoel Be'er Sheva were promoted as champions of the 2000-01 Liga Leumit. Maccabi Kiryat Gat were promoted as runners up. Hapoel Be'er Sheva returned to the top flight after an absence of four seasons while Maccabi Kiryat Gat made their debut in the top flight.

Bnei Yehuda and Tzafririm Holon were relegated after finishing in the bottom two places in the 2000-01 season.

 The club played their home games at a neutral venue because their own ground did not meet Premier League requirements.

Final table

Results

First and second round

Third round

Top goal scorers

See also
2001–02 Toto Cup Al

 

Israeli Premier League seasons
Israel
1